Ernest Henry may refer to:

 Ernest Henry (engineer) (1885-1950), Swiss mechanical engineer
 Ernest Henry (swimmer) (1904–1998), Australian freestyle swimmer
 Ernest Henry (explorer) (1837–1919), explorer of North-West Queensland

Other uses
 Ernest Henry mine, Queensland, Australia